Bond of Fear is a 1956 British crime drama film directed by Henry Cass and starring Dermot Walsh, Jane Barrett, and John Colicos.

Premise
John Sewell and his family are taken hostage by a desperate fugitive called Dewar who is a stowaway in their caravan.

Cast 
 Dermot Walsh as John Sewell
 Jane Barrett as Mary Sewell
 John Colicos as Dewar
 Marilyn Baker as Ann Sewell
 Anthony Pavey as Michael Sewell
 Alan MacNaughtan as Detective Sergeant Daley
 Jameson Clark as Scotty
 John Horsley as Motor Cycle Policeman
 Marianne Stone as Mrs. Simon
 Arnold Bell as Police Sergeant at Road Block
 Avril Angers as Girl Hiker
 Bill Shine as Man Hiker
 Peter Swanwick as Travelling Salesman
 Hal Osmond as Hospital Orderly
 Trevor Reid as Dover Police Inspector
 Alan Robinson as Dover Immigration Official

References

External links
 

British crime drama films
1956 films
1956 crime drama films
Films directed by Henry Cass
Films about hostage takings
British black-and-white films
1950s English-language films
1950s British films